Gregory J. Read is an Australian filmmaker.

Read started his film career writing, directing, producing and editing the documentaries Spirits of the Carnival, Tides of Passage, and Photographers of Australia: Dupain, Sievers, Moore. In 2006 Read wrote and directed Like Minds starring Eddie Redmayne (in his feature film début), Tom Sturridge, Toni Collette and Richard Roxburough.

Although Like Minds was Read's directorial feature film début,  he had assisted in the production of many low-budget Australian features and directed, produced and/or art directed may television commercials and Music videos for performers such as Kate Ceberano, Iva Davis, Grant McLennon and the Divinyls.

In 2008 Gregory established Aerial Film Australia, an specialist aerial company with credits on films such as, Unbroken, San Andreas (film), Pirates of the Caribbean: Dead Men Tell No Tales, Alien: Covenant, Lion, The Meg, The Shallows, Peter Rabbit, Pacific Rim: Uprising, Aquaman and Spiderhead.

In 2011 Gregory produced with Anthony Waddington the multi award-winning Fred Schepisi directed film The Eye of the Storm (2011 film)

2007-2018 Gregory wrote, shot and directed the Australian Writers' Guild (AWGIE) award-winning (2020) feature documentary, Own the Sky chronicling David Mayman's epic journey in the development of the world's first real Jetpack. 2018 Gregory shot, field directed and associate produced the Akos Armont directed feature documentary Brabham (2020).

External links

Aerial Film Australasia  www.afa.film
www.paperbarkfilms.com

References

Footnotes

Australian film directors
Year of birth missing (living people)
Living people